This is a list of dairy product companies in the United States. A dairy product is food produced from the milk of mammals. Dairy products are usually high energy-yielding food products. A production plant for the processing of milk is called a dairy or a dairy factory.

Dairy product companies in the United States

A
  All American Foods
  Alpenrose Dairy 
  Alta Dena
  Alto Dairy Cooperative 
  Aurora Organic Dairy – based in Boulder, Colorado, it operates large factory farms, each with thousands of dairy cows, in Colorado and Texas

B

  Beatrice Foods 
  Bittersweet Plantation Dairy 
  Blue Bell Creameries
  Blue Bunny 
  Blue Valley Creamery Company 
  Borden Dairy 
  Braum's 
  Brewster Dairy 
  Broughton Foods Company 
  Byrne Dairy
   BelGioioso Cheese Inc.

C

  Capriole Goat Cheese 
  Carnation – founded as an evaporated milk company in 1899
  Carvel 
  Cass-Clay 
  Chaseholm Farm Creamery 
  Cielo 
  Clover Stornetta Farms 
  Cooksville Cheese Factory 
  Coolhaus 
  Cornell Dairy 
  Cypress Grove Chevre 
  Cypress Point Creamery

D
  Dairy Farmers of America – a national milk marketing cooperative that is owned by and serves nearly 15,000 dairy farmer-members, representing more than 9,000 dairy farms in 48 states
  Dairylea Cooperative Inc. 
  Danone 
  Darigold 
  DCI Cheese Company 
  Dean Foods 
  Dreyer's

E
  Eagle Brand 
  Ellsworth Cooperative Creamery – a producer of cheese curds located in Ellsworth, Wisconsin that was established in 1910
  Elmhurst Dairy- New York, NY

F
  Fairmount Food Group 
  Ferndale Dairies 
  Foster Farms Dairy

G
  Galliker's 
  Garelick Farms 
  The Greek Gods 
  Gustafson's Farm

H

  Happy Cow Creamery 
  Hershey Creamery Company – a creamery that produces Hershey's brand ice cream.
  Hey Brothers Ice Cream 
  Hilmar Cheese Company 
  Horizon Organic 
  HP Hood 
  Humboldt Creamery

I
  Isaly's

J
  Jackson Ice Cream Company 
  Joseph Gallo Farms – a large family-owned dairy operation that is prominent in California’s dairy industry; based in Livingston, California
  Junket

K
 Kemps
 Killer Shake 
 Kraft Heinz – a result of the merger of Kraft Foods with Heinz

L

 Land O'Lakes – a member-owned agricultural cooperative based in the Minneapolis-St. Paul suburb of Arden Hills, Minnesota
 Louis Trauth Dairy
Leprino Foods

M
  Maine's Own Organic Milk Company 
  Marin French Cheese Company 
  Mayfield Dairy 
  Maytag Dairy Farms – established in 1941 by Frederick Louis Maytag II and based in Newton, Iowa, it manufactures blue cheese and other cheeses
  Meadow Gold Dairies
  Murray's Cheese

N

O
  Oakhurst Dairy 
  Oberweis Dairy 
  Organic Valley

P

 Pacific Coast Condensed Milk Company 
 Penn State University Creamery
 Pet, Inc. 
 Pierre's Ice Cream Company 
 Point Reyes Farmstead Cheese Company 
 Prairie Farms Dairy – a dairy cooperative operating out of Carlinville
 Purity Dairies

R
 Rogue Creamery, Since 2002, an artisan cheese operation located in Oregon, winner of 30 international and over 50 national cheese-making awards.
 Rockview Farms

S

 Saputo Inc. 
 Sargento − one of the largest privately held companies in the United States, and one of the largest retail cheese companies in the U.S.
 Schoep's Ice Cream 
 Schreiber Foods 
 Schuman Cheese
 Shamrock Farms 
 Sheffield Farms
 Siggi's Dairy
 Smiling Hill Farm 
 Smith Dairy 
 Sorrento Lactalis
 Stewart's Shops
 Stonyfield Farm
 Straus Family Creamery
 Surfing Goat Dairy 
 Sweet Grass Dairy

T
 T. G. Lee Dairy
 Tillamook Cheese
 Tuscan Dairy Farms
 Turkey Hill Dairy

U
 United Dairy Farmers – a chain of shops offering ice cream and other dairy products; has stores throughout the greater Cincinnati, Ohio area, as well as Dayton and Columbus

W
  Wainwright Dairy 
  Waldrep Dairy Farm 
  Winchester Cheese Company 
  Winder Farms 
  Winter Park Dairy
  Wawa Food Markets  1890, George Wood, a businessperson from New Jersey, moved to Delaware County, Pennsylvania; it was here that he began the Wawa Dairy Farm.

Y
  Yakult USA 
  Yancey's Fancy 
  Yarnell Ice Cream Co.

See also

 Dairy farming
 List of brand name food products
 List of cheesemakers
 List of dairy products
 List of food companies

Further reading
 Von Keyserlingk, M. A. G., et al. "Invited review: Sustainability of the US dairy industry." Journal of Dairy Science 96.9 (2013): 5405-5425.

References

Dairy companies